Beryl Cooke (1 November 1906 – 21 August 2001) was an English actress. Her career spanned six decades; she is most familiar to British audiences as Aunt Lucy in the sitcom Happy Ever After and Mrs. Vance in the BBC drama Tenko.

Life

She was born in Westminster, London on 1 November 1906.

She died in London on 21 August 2001 aged 94. She is buried in East London Cemetery.

TV

Cooke made an appearance in British sitcom Only Fools and Horses in the episode The Second Time Around, as a woman Del Boy (David Jason) and Rodney (Nicholas Lyndhurst) believe to be their Aunt Rose, only for it to emerge that the real Aunt Rose moved away some years beforehand.

Filmography

Film

Television

References

External links
 

1906 births
2001 deaths
English television actresses
20th-century British businesspeople